Ladipo (alternatively spelled Oladipo) is both a Yoruba surname and a given name meaning "Wealth and Prosperity". Notable people with the name include:

Surname:
Duro Ladipo (1931–1978), Nigerian dramatist
Kehinde Oluwatoyin Ladipo, Nigerian geologist 
Margaret Ladipo (born 1961), Nigerian academic
Sarah Ladipo Manyika (born 1968), Nigerian-British writer
Sule Ladipo (born 1974), Nigerian tennis player

Given name:
Ladipo Oluwole (1892-1953), Nigerian physician
Ladipo Adamolekun (born 1942), Nigerian academic
Ladipo Solanke (c. 1886–1958), Nigerian activist

References

Yoruba given names
Yoruba-language surnames